Omar Mahmoud El Sayed Gaber (born 30 January 1992) is an Egyptian footballer who plays for Egyptian Premier League side Zamalek and the Egyptian national team mainly as a right-back but also sometimes as a midfielder.

Club career

Zamalek
Gaber played his youth football at Zamalek. In the 2009/10 season he advanced to their first team and soon played for them regularly. On 10 May 2016 it was announced that he would move to Switzerland. Egyptian media reports said Basel will pay Zamalek 1.65 million euros to acquire Gaber's services.

Basel
In May 2016, FC Basel had reached an agreement with Zamalek to transfer Gaber during the summer transfer window. He was assigned the number 4 shirt. The 24-year-old Gaber became the fourth Egyptian player to join Basel in less than five years, after signing a four-year contract with the Swiss side. On 10 May Basel confirmed the four-year deal. 

On 1 July 2016 Gaber joined Basel's first team for their 2016–17 season under head coach Urs Fischer.
After playing in six test games Gaber played his domestic league debut for the club in the home game in the St. Jakob-Park on 24 July 2016 in the 3–0 home win against Sion. Under trainer Urs Fischer Gaber won the Swiss Super League championship at the end of the 2016–17 Super League season. For the club this was the eighth title in a row and their 20th championship title in total. They also won the Swiss Cup for the twelfth time, which meant they had won the double for the sixth time in the club's history. Gaber played in three cup games.

In the following season Gaber was not gaining much playing time and so the club looked for another solution. On 21 November 2017 Basel announced that Gaber would be loaned out to Los Angeles Football Club so that he could obtain match practice in the North American professional league. Gaber was not to return to the club. During his short period with RotBlau, Gaber played a total of 30 games for Basel without scoring a goal. 13 of these games were in the Swiss Super League, six in the Swiss Cup, one in the Champions League and ten were friendly games.

Loan to Los Angeles FC
In January 2018, Gaber joined Los Angeles FC on loan from Basel, with an option of taking over the player on a definitive basis. In his first 6 months Gaber played seven games in the Major League Soccer.

Pyramids FC
On 12 July 2018, MLS expansion side LAFC picked up their option on making Omar Gaber's loan from FC Basel permanent. Basel confirmed the deal on the same day.
 However, the club immediately completed his transfer to Egyptian Premier League side Pyramids FC.

Return to Zamalek
In September 2022, Gaber returned to his parent club Zamalek, by signing a contract until 2025.

International career
Gaber played his debut for Egypt U20 on 17 April 2011 in the 2–0 victory against Lesotho U20. He represented Egypt at the 2011 FIFA U-20 World Cup in Colombia.

Gaber played his debut for Egypt U23 on 27 November of the same year in the 1–0 victory against Gabon U23. He played his debut for Egypt in 2011.

In May 2018 he was named in Egypt's preliminary squad for the 2018 FIFA World Cup in Russia.

Career statistics

International
Statistics accurate as of match played 27 September 2022.

International goals
Scores and results list Egypt's goal tally first.

Honours
Zamalek
Egyptian Premier League: 2014–15
Egypt Cup: 2012–13, 2013–14, 2014–15

Basel
 Swiss Super League: 2016–17
 Swiss Cup: 2016–17

References

External links

1992 births
Living people
Footballers from Cairo
Egyptian footballers
Association football midfielders
Zamalek SC players
FC Basel players
Los Angeles FC players
Expatriate footballers in Switzerland
Expatriate soccer players in the United States
Egyptian expatriate sportspeople in Switzerland
Egyptian expatriate sportspeople in the United States
Swiss Super League players
2011 CAF U-23 Championship players
Olympic footballers of Egypt
Footballers at the 2012 Summer Olympics
2017 Africa Cup of Nations players
Egyptian Premier League players
Major League Soccer players
2018 FIFA World Cup players
Egypt international footballers
Egypt youth international footballers
Pyramids FC players
Egyptian expatriate footballers
2019 Africa Cup of Nations players